The Romania national under-17 football team represents Romania in international football at this age level and is controlled by the Federația Română de Fotbal, the governing body for football in Romania.

Competitive record

UEFA European Under-16 and Under-17 Championship

Under-16 era

*Draws also include penalty shootouts, regardless of the outcome.

Under-17 era

*Draws also include penalty shootouts, regardless of the outcome.

Current squad
 The following players were called up for the 2023 UEFA European Under-17 Championship qualification matches.
 Match dates: 26 October – 1 November 2022
 Opposition: ,  and 
Caps and goals correct as of: 27 September 2022, after the match against

Results and fixtures

2020

U-17

U-16

See also 
 Romania national football team
 Romania national under-21 football team
 Romania national under-20 football team
 Romania national under-19 football team
 Romania national under-16 football team
 UEFA European Under-17 Championship

References

External links
 Football Association of Romania

European national under-17 association football teams
Football